Birsen Bekgöz (previously known under the married names Birsen Yavuz and Birsen Engin; born October 18, 1980) is a Turkish female track and field athlete competing in sprinting events.  She is a member of Enkaspor athletics team. She studied at the Eastern Mediterranean University in Northern Cyprus.

She started her sports career in Ankara and became later a member of the club Bursa Nilüfer Belediyespor. During her time at the Near East University in Nicosia, she ran for Northern Cyprus. Bekgöz is currently at Enkaspor in Istanbul.

She participated at the 2005 Mediterranean Games in Almería, Spain in the categories 200 metres, 400 m hurdles, 4x100 m relay  and 4x400 m relay. She ran bronze medal with her teammates Özge Gürler, Pınar Saka and Binnaz Uslu in 4x400 relay. She won the silver medal in the 4x400 m relay event with her teammates Özge Akın, Esma Aydemir and Sema Apak at the 2013 Islamic Solidarity Games held in Palembang, Indonesia.

Achievements

References

External links

1980 births
Living people
Turkish female sprinters
Turkish female hurdlers
Enkaspor athletes
Athletes (track and field) at the 2012 Summer Olympics
Olympic athletes of Turkey
Eastern Mediterranean University alumni
European champions for Turkey
Mediterranean Games silver medalists for Turkey
Mediterranean Games bronze medalists for Turkey
Athletes (track and field) at the 2005 Mediterranean Games
Athletes (track and field) at the 2013 Mediterranean Games
Mediterranean Games medalists in athletics
Survivor Turkey contestants
Islamic Solidarity Games competitors for Turkey
Turkish expatriate sportspeople in Northern Cyprus
20th-century Turkish sportswomen
21st-century Turkish sportswomen